The National Railway Museum of New Zealand (NRM) is being built to show the history of the New Zealand railways. Work is underway to open at Ferrymead Heritage Park in Ferrymead, Christchurch by the end of 2021 at the site of New Zealand's first railway opened in 1863.

The museum owns one electric locomotive from Wellington, one electric multiple unit also from Wellington and three wagons with a leased diesel shunter. The museum will also other NZR and Bush locomotives from the Canterbury Railway Society. The museum will also display other rolling stock including a turntable from Auckland and any other suitable railway material. The museum is still being built with the turntable in place.

Locomotives and rolling stock

Diesel Locomotives

Electric Locomotives

Electric multiple units

Wagons

References

External links
 NRM official website

Museums established in 2015

Heritage railways in New Zealand
Railway museums in New Zealand
National museums of New Zealand
Proposed museums
Museums in Christchurch
Rail transport in Christchurch
Proposed buildings and structures in New Zealand